The Tin Star is a 1957 American Western film based on a short story, directed in VistaVision by Anthony Mann and starring Henry Fonda and Anthony Perkins, in one of Perkins' first roles. The film became one of the few low-budget westerns to be nominated for the Oscar for Best Writing, Story or Screenplay. Since its release, the film has become one of the classics of the genre. The supporting cast features Betsy Palmer, Neville Brand, John McIntire and Lee Van Cleef.

Plot 
Bounty hunter Morgan Hickman (Henry Fonda) arrives in a small town with the body of an outlaw, seeking the bounty. While the general townsfolk openly abhor Hickman, young sheriff Ben Owens (Anthony Perkins), while angry with Morg for not bringing the wanted man in alive, also admires him for taking everything in his stride and knowing how to handle dangerous situations.

Owens has a steady girl called Millie. Her father, the previous sheriff, was killed and she refuses to marry Owens unless he quits the job. Owens enjoys the authority and wants to prove himself; he asks Morg to give him some lessons to gain confidence, particularly because he is going to have to face up to the town loudmouth, Bogardus (Neville Brand). Morg tells the young man that he was once a sheriff himself until a personal loss changed him. He advises Owens to quit and marry his girl but eventually agrees to provide some advice while awaiting the arrival of the bounty money.

Due to the community's open hostility toward Morg, he cannot find a place to stay. He befriends Nona Mayfield (Betsy Palmer), whose own relationship with most of the citizens has been tense due to her half-Indian son, Kip (Michel Ray). Morg moves into a room in her house on the edge of town.

Matters come to a head after local doctor McCord is murdered. After delivering a baby son to a remote homesteader, McCord is returning home during the night but is waylaid by Ed McGaffey (Lee Van Cleef). McGaffey demands that the doctor treat his brother's gunshot wound, received when the brothers attacked a stagecoach, killing the guard. After McCord treats the brother, McGaffey decides to kill him because it is apparent the doctor will put two and two together and know the two are responsible for the murder.

Dr. McCord's horse and trap re-enter the town on McCord Day: everyone has come out to celebrate the doctor's 75th birthday, offering up a resounding chorus of "For He's A Jolly Good Fellow". It is soon obvious that the doctor is dead. A posse is then assembled to catch the McGaffey brothers. However, the posse splits from Owens – they see him as too soft for insisting the men be brought in alive – and the dangerous Bogardus becomes their leader.

Young Kip, fascinated by the posse as they pass his house, rides out after them on the horse Morg has given him as a present. When Morg discovers this, he spurns Owens' pleas to join him in tracking the killers and sets off to find the boy. Owens eventually joins him.

When they find Kip they also stumble upon the brothers hiding in a mountain cave. After a gunfight in which Owens receives a bullet graze on the forehead, and a clever ploy by Morg, they successfully capture the brothers and lock them in the town jail. The posse, urged on by Bogardus, is baying for blood and want to lynch the pair. To build the courage to complete the deed, the men get drunk in the saloon.

Owens, demonstrating the newfound confidence and strength he has gleaned from Morg, stands against the crowd with a shotgun to defend the McGaffeys' right to a legal trial. Bogardus makes it clear he will face down the sheriff; Owens approaches the man alone after handing the shotgun to the newly-deputized Morg. The mob separates, anticipating a gunfight. Owens confronts Bogardus and slaps him. This seems to take the wind out of the troublemaker and he turns away, appearing to back down. But, after a few steps, he turns and draws. Owens guns him down. At this point, the lynch mob disperses.

Owens and Millie, who has decided she will subdue her fear as best she can and marry him, bid goodbye to Morg who is happily leaving town with Nona and Kip.

Cast 
Henry Fonda as Morgan Hickman
Anthony Perkins as Sheriff Ben Owens
Betsy Palmer as Nona Mayfield
Michel Ray as Kip Mayfield
Neville Brand as Bart Bogardus
John McIntire as Dr Joseph J. 'Doc' McCord
Mary Webster as Millie Parker
Lee Van Cleef as Ed McGaffey
Peter Baldwin as Zeke McGaffey
Richard Shannon as Buck Henderson
Howard Petrie as Mayor Harvey King
Frank Cady as Abe Pickett (uncredited)
Frank McGrath as Jim Clark, the stagecoach driver (uncredited)

Reception
The Tin Star holds an 86% rating on Rotten Tomatoes based on seven reviews.

See also
 List of American films of 1957

References

External links

 
 
 
 

1957 films
1957 Western (genre) films
American Western (genre) films
Films shot in Los Angeles County, California
Films directed by Anthony Mann
Films produced by William Perlberg
Films scored by Elmer Bernstein
Films with screenplays by Dudley Nichols
Paramount Pictures films
American black-and-white films
1950s American films
1950s English-language films